The 2022–23 Toledo Rockets women's basketball team represents University of Toledo during the 2022–23 NCAA Division I women's basketball season. The Rockets, led by fifteenth year head coach Tricia Cullop, play their home games at Savage Arena, as members of the Mid-American Conference.  The Rockets completed MAC play with a 16–2 record to claim the regular season championship for the second straight season.  As the top seed they defeated Buffalo, Kent State, and Bowling Green to win the MAC tournament.  They were placed as the twelfth seed in the Seattle Region 3 of the 2023 NCAA tournament where they defeated Iowa State in the first round.  They will play Tennessee in the second round.

Roster

Schedule
Source:

|-
!colspan=9 style=| Exhibition

|-
!colspan=9 style=| Non-conference regular season

|-
!colspan=9 style=| MAC regular season

|-
!colspan=9 style=| MAC Women's Tournament

|-
!colspan=9 style=| NCAA women's tournament

See also
 2022–23 Toledo Rockets men's basketball team

References

Toledo
Toledo Rockets women's basketball seasons
Toledo Rockets women's basketball team
Toledo Rockets women's basketball team
Toledo